The trial of Hamid Nouri, an Iranian official detained in Sweden, took place in November 2019. Nouri was found guilty of being a key figure in the 1988 executions of Iranian political prisoners, where according to different estimates between 2,800 to 30,000 Iranians were massacred. In early 2021 charges of murder and war crimes were filed against the former Iranian prosecutor, where Nouri was accused of "torture and inhuman treatment." The trial constituted the first time someone has been charged in relation to the 1988 massacre of political prisoners. Nouri was charged with more than 100 murders and "a serious crime against international law", and he is expected to provide evidence also implicating Ebrahim Raisi, president of Iran at the time of the trial.

Nouri was sentenced to life in prison and expulsion with a permanent bar from re-entering Sweden, and ordered to pay damages amounting to 1,2 million SEK.

Background
Hamid Nouri, born on 29 April 1961, was known as Hamid Abbasi among political inmates. He was an IRGC jail guard recruited by the Iranian Judiciary. He assisted prosecutors in Evin and Gohardasht Prison and worked closely with Mohammad Moghiseh, the prison's associate prosecutor, and was also a member of the Gohardasht Prison Death Commission in 1988. The 1988 killings targeted members of People's Mujahedin of Iran (MEK), a group that advocated overthrowing the leadership of the Islamic Republic of Iran. The MEK is responsible for the Hafte Tir bombing and 1981 Iranian Prime Minister's office bombing, which killed Iran's president, prime minister, chief of police, several ministers and deputy ministers, dozens of parliament's members, and other government officials. In 1988, the MEK supported by Saddam Hussein of Iraq launched the Operation Eternal Light in order to occupy central parts of Iran. Iran considered this as aiding the enemy during war and treason, and carried the executions as a response.

The executions resulted from a 1988 fatwa ordered by Ayatollah Khomeini. The fatwa ordered the execution of all the Iranian prisoners that supported and were loyal to the MEK.

An audio file by former Deputy Supreme Leader, Ayatollah Hussein-Ali Montazeri, emerged in 2016 where Montazeri is heard  telling Hossein Ali Nayeri, Morteza Eshraghi, Ebrahim Raisi, and Mostafa Pourmohammadi that "the biggest crime in the Islamic Republic, for which the history will condemn us, has been committed at your hands, and they'll write your names as criminals in the history."

Arrest 
On November 9, 2019, Swedish police arrested Nouri at Arlanda Airport. Swedish police had been alerted to Noury's imminent arrival after a tip-off from his former son in law, Hirossch Sadeghi. Sadeghi, after unsuccessfully trying to alert two journalists at the BBC Persian and VOA Farsi, found a survivor of the executions, Iraj Mesdaghi. who immediately, in the presence of Sadeghi, telephoned Kaveh Moussavi, an Oxford based human rights lawyer in the UK. Moussavi immediately mobilised a legal team with colleagues Dr Rebecca Mooney and Matthew Jury. The legal team interviewed several witnesses, and drafted Representations setting out the factual and legal basis on which Noury was suspected of committing grave crimes during the 1988 Prison Massacres in Iran.  Moussavi, Mooney and Jury, with Swedish Advokat Göran Hjalmarsson, submitted the Representations and evidence to the Swedish War Crimes Police on November 4 2019, alerting them to Noury's imminent arrival, and urging the authorities to arrest, investigate and prosecute Noury for crimes against international law. Nouri was arrested under the rules of universal jurisdiction, in which a national court can prosecute anyone for atrocities, regardless of where they were committed.

Investigation
An investigation organised by the Borumand Foundation conducted by the UK leading Counsel Geoffrey Roberston QC had earlier concluded that egregious violations of international human rights laws had been carried out by the regime in Iran in the aftermath of the Death Fatwa issued by Ayatollah Khomeini ordering the killing of political prisoners who had remained "steadfast" in their views. 
In 2016, an investigation committee examining the 1988 massacre and individuals implicated was proposed by Maryam Rajavi. This committee looked at Moghisei, Lashgari, and Nouri. These efforts seek a trial for all government officials involved in the 1988 massacre, including Supreme Leader Ali Khamenei, President Ebrahim Raisi, and Supreme Court Chief Mohseni-Ejei. On 3 May  2021, 152 former UN officials, Nobel laureates, former leaders of state, and human rights experts called for an international investigation.

Trial
Nouri was first detained in 2019. He was an assistant public prosecutor who reportedly took on an important role in the execution of Iranian political prisoners in 1988. Nouri is accused of providing names to prosecutors, giving death sentences, and taking prisoners to execution chambers.

Prosecutors in Stockholm district court recited charges against Hamid Nouri, including murder and a serious crime against international law. He was allegedly assistant to the deputy prosecutor of Gohardasht Prison in Karaj, outside Tehran, between July 30 and August 16, 1988. Nouri is also being accused of "torture, execution, and secret burial of the victims and not letting their families know about their burial place."

Nouri's lawyer, Daniel Marcus, said he would counter all claims during the trial. The three-day trial had been expected to take place in April 2022. In 2018, the UN also stated that the 1988 massacre was a "crime against humanity".
Swedish prosecutors have asked for the maximum sentence, life imprisonment.

The trial started in August 2021 in Stockholm District Court and lasted for 92 days, ending May 2022.

Verdict
On 14 July 2022, Nouri was sentenced to life in prison and expulsion with a permanent bar from re-entering Sweden, and ordered to pay damages amounting to 1.2 million SEK.

In Swedish law, a person sentenced to life imprisonment may apply to have the sentence commuted to a fixed-term sentence after having served at least ten years of the sentence. If the sentence is commuted, the fixed-term sentence shall not be less than the maximum term of imprisonment that may be imposed for the crime, which for murder and a serious a crime against international law is 18 years. If and when he is released, he will be expelled from the country.

Noury has appealed the verdict, and the appeal court proceedings will begin on January 11, 2023.

Statements from civil plaintiffs lawyer  
Lawyer Kenneth Lewis said that the sentence of execution of political prisoners was issued to members and supporters of the MEK and suggested that Khomeini had likely issued the sentence as a result of MEK operations before Operation Forough Javidan.
According to Lewis, the Islamic Revolutionary Guard Corps had engaged in armed clashes against the MEK dressed in Kurdish uniforms to show that the MEK were fighting against pro-Iranian Kurds together with Iraq. Lewis then said that reporters in attendance during these clashes did not document the presence of any Iraqi forces, and that by the end of the war the MEK had contacted the Red Cross with the aim of freeing 1,500 captured war prisoners back to Iran.

Response by Tehran 
The government in Iran "expressed outrage" over the trial, calling it "completely illegal" and "politically motivated". Iran’s Intelligence Minister Esmaeil Khatib said that Ahmad Reza Djalali's "espionage for the Zionist regime has been proven and his death sentence has gone through all judicial stages. The Swedish government, on behalf of the Zionist regime and the United States, illegally detained our citizen Mr. Hamid Nouri in Sweden shortly after his arrest and trial, and took him hostage."

International response 
The Swedish newspaper Aftonbladet quoted saying that recent arrests of Swedes in Iran and the death sentence of Ahmad Reza Djalali were a "warning" in retaliation for Nouri's trial.

Human right groups said that the Government of the Islamic Republic of Iran has a pattern of hostage diplomacy where dual or foreign nationals are "detained on trumped-up charges of espionage and then leveraged politically to release frozen funds, or to be exchanged for Iranian citizens incarcerated in other countries."

Temporary relocation to Albania 
The trial relocated to Durrës, Albania for two weeks in order to facilitate testimonies from People's Mujahedin of Iran witnesses. The first trial session took place on November 10.

Testimonies
Testimonies so far have been made by witnesses including members of the MEK. The trial has received testimonies from victims telling of torture, mass hangings, and "brutal summary justice". Reza Falahi told AFP that he had seen Nouri while he was at “the death corridor”, and “whenever they read some people’s names he followed them toward the death chamber.”

Mohammad Zand, who was arrested in 1981 for supporting the MEK, was the first plaintiff and witness at the court in Durres. According to Zand, Nouri participated in taking people to be executed. Zand also said that these were "only a small part of the clerical regime's crimes".
According to accusers, Nouri's duties included ushering prisoners to panels and to their executions. His arrest is considered a "significant victory" for victims of human rights violations in Iran.

References

Human rights in Iran
Trials of political people
Albania–Sweden relations
Albania–Iran relations
Iran–Sweden relations
Trials in Sweden
Trials in Albania